Pillaiyo Pillai is 1972 Indian Tamil-language romantic drama film directed by Krishnan–Panju, produced by Murasoli Maran and written by M. Karunanidhi. The film stars M. K. Muthu (in dual role) in his debut film appearance alongside Vijayakumari and Lakshmi, while Manohar, M. R. R. Vasu and G. Sakunthala play supporting roles. It was released on 23 June 1972 and emerged a commercial success.

Plot 

Gangatharan, a criminal and womaniser, poses as a noble man in public. He indulges in stealing temple sculptures. Gangatharan murders his first wife and frames the crime his servant Murugan, who is arrested. Murugan escapes from prison and kidnaps Gangatharan's son and raises him as his own. Gangatharan gets remarried to Kanchana, whom Murugan kidnaps. But he releases her, when Kanchana confesses that she is bearing a child. When Gangatharan learns of his wife's pregnancy, he drives her away, she gives birth to a son.

Years later, the boy raised by Murugan, Kumar, is a doctor. Kanchana's son Kannan grows up to become a straightforward and hardworking person. Confusion ensues as the public prosecutor's daughter falls in love with one of the sons, often mistaking Kannan for Kumar. As part of his plans to wreak vengeance, Gangatharan accuses Kumar of stealing a ring and beats him up. How the problems are solved forms the rest of the story.

Cast 
 M. K. Muthu as Kumar and Kannan
Vijayakumari as Kanchana
Lakshmi as the public prosecutor's daughter
 Manohar as Gangatharan
 M. R. R. Vasu as Murugan
 G. Sakunthala as Gangatharan's first wife
V. K. Ramasamy 
Nagesh

Production 
Pillaiyo Pillai is the debut film for M. K. Muthu as an actor. Principal photography began on 21 October 1971.

Soundtrack 
Music was by M. S. Viswanathan and lyrics were written by Kannadasan and Vaali. The song "Moondru Thamizh Thondriyathum" is set in the Carnatic raga known as Charukesi.

Release 
Pillaiyo Pillai was released on 23 June 1972, and emerged a commercial success.

References

External links 
 

1970s Tamil-language films
1972 films
1972 romantic drama films
Films directed by Krishnan–Panju
Films scored by M. S. Viswanathan
Films with screenplays by M. Karunanidhi
Indian black-and-white films
Indian romantic drama films